The Seongnam Central Library is located in Yatap-dong, Seongnam, South Korea. It opened in 2001, and is the largest library in Seongnam city.

Library layout
The library has five levels

Underground
 Cafeteria
 Convenience Store

First Floor
 Family Reading Room
 Kids Reading Room
 Kids Library
 Disabilities Reading Room
 Main Hall
 Hall Reading Room (approximately 200 seats)

Second Floor
 Cyber Room (including DVD seats, Audio seats, Computer seats and Laptop seats)
 "First Library" (Science, Art, Religion, Language, Philosophy, Society, Others, Encyclopedia, English books)
 "Second Library" (Literature, History)
(The collections include over 300 000 books)

Third Floor
 First Reading Room (216 seats, no carrells)
 Second Reading Room (216 seats)
 Outside Terrace
 Screen Room

Fourth Floor
Third Reading Room (216 seats, for adults)
Fourth Reading Room( 216 seats)

Library conditions of use
 Under 12 years old children (Korean are 14 years old) cannot use Reading room, Cyber room and Library (except for those specifically designated for children)
 Library users must create an account with a card (this can use every library in Seongnam).  It can access all rooms. Exceptions for children and cafeteria usage.
 Access to reading room seats (except Kid's reading rooms) requires the card.

Restrictions
 Without parental guidance, children are not allowed in many of the library spaces
 During Exam Seasons (late April-early May, July, late September-early October, December) and vacation (peak season Summer and Winter) seating may in high demand.
 The First and Second Reading Room close at 10 pm.
 The library is closed on Mondays.

Sources
http://ct.snlib.net/

Library buildings completed in 2001
2001 establishments in South Korea
Buildings and structures in Gyeonggi Province
Libraries in South Korea
Buildings and structures in Seongnam